Martin Johansson (born 26 February 1973) is a Swedish short track speed skater. He competed at the 1994 Winter Olympics, the 1998 Winter Olympics and the 2002 Winter Olympics.

References

External links
 

1973 births
Living people
Swedish male short track speed skaters
Olympic short track speed skaters of Sweden
Short track speed skaters at the 1994 Winter Olympics
Short track speed skaters at the 1998 Winter Olympics
Short track speed skaters at the 2002 Winter Olympics
Sportspeople from Malmö
20th-century Swedish people